Tetchi Jores Charlemagne Ulrich Okore (born 11 August 1992), known as Jores Okore, is a Danish professional footballer who plays as a centre-back for Changchun Yatai.

Okore is considered a capable and aggressive defender, who is known for his pace and strength.

Early life
Okore was born in Abidjan, Ivory Coast. He moved to Denmark with his family at the age of three, where he played football from the age of eight with B.93 in the Østerbro district of Copenhagen. He moved to Nordsjælland in 2007, where he captained the youth side.

Senior career

Nordsjælland
Having previously made a handful of appearances in Danish Cup games, including being part of the Nordsjælland Cup-winning team in 2010–11, Okore made his league debut against Horsens on 3 April 2011, coming on as a substitute for Michael Parkhurst. Okore would continue to making first-team appearances in place of the injured Parkhurst for the remainder of the 2010–11 season, going on to make 11 league appearances and creating one assist. Okore signed a new four-year contract with the Farum-based club in June 2011, and was made an official member of the senior squad for the 2011–12 Superliga season by newly appointed head coach Kasper Hjulmand. 

On 18 September 2011, Jores scored his first senior goal for Nordsjælland in a 2–0 league win over Brøndby. It was his only goal in that season. In November 2011, he signed a new contract, extending his stay with the club to December 2016. He was made vice-captain of Nordsjælland for the 2012–13 season.

Aston Villa
On 13 June 2013, Okore signed for English Premier League club Aston Villa on a four-year deal for a fee believed to be in the region of £4 million. Nordsjælland confirmed via the club's official Twitter and Facebook accounts that he was their most expensive sale ever. He made his Premier League debut on 21 August 2013 at Stamford Bridge against Chelsea, replacing the injured Ciaran Clark a few minutes before half-time. Okore made his first Premier League start on 24 August in Villa's home game against Liverpool. On 16 September 2013, Villa announced that Okore will be sidelined for the 2013–14 season after suffering a ruptured anterior cruciate ligament injury in his right knee in a game against Newcastle United on 14 September; the injury required season-ending surgery.

On 24 November 2014, Okore made his return to the Villa first team in a 1–1 draw against Southampton at Villa Park, 14 months after his injury. He scored his first goal for Villa in a 2–1 defeat to Chelsea at Villa Park, nodding in a cross from Carles Gil. On 9 April 2016, Okore refused to take a position as a substitute on the bench for Villa's game against AFC Bournemouth. Subsequently he told caretaker manager, Eric Black that he did not want to be considered for any further games in the 2015–16 season. He was removed from the first-team squad and ordered to train with the under-21 side.

FC Copenhagen
On 27 August 2016, it was confirmed, that Okore had signed a four-year contract with Danish Superliga-club FC Copenhagen. He made his Superliga debut for the club on 18 November 2016, when he came on as a substitute in the 89th minute instead of Rasmus Falk in a 2–1 victory over AaB. In his sole season at the club, Okore made five Superliga appearance, in which he played full time in three of the matches.

AaB
On 6 July 2017, it was announced that Okore moved to AaB from Copenhagen for a reported fee of DKK 4.2 million. He signed a three-year contract keeping him at the club until 30 June 2020.

Changchun Yatai
Okore signed a three-year contract with recently promoted Chinese Super League club Changchun Yatai on 25 February 2021, after having made 116 official appearances for AaB. After the move, Okore stated: "As a club and as a city, AaB and Aalborg have more than matched my expectations, and I look back on a good time". He made his debut as a starter for Changchun Yatai on 22 April 2021, the first matchday of the Super League in a 2–1 away win over Dalian Pro.

International career
On 6 September 2011, Okore made his international youth debut for the Denmark under-21 team at the age of 19, participating in a UEFA Under-21 Championship Qualifier, winning 3–0 over Northern Ireland.

Having made his debut two months earlier for the U21s, on 6 November 2011 Jores Okore was called up to the Danish senior team as a replacement for Simon Kjær, for a friendly against Sweden on 11 November 2011. He made his senior debut in that match, coming on at the 62nd minute, replacing his club teammate Andreas Bjelland. Okore was retained for the following international friendly against Finland, where he received his second cap and first start on 15 November 2011.

Okore was once again called up in December 2011 for Denmark's tour of Thailand in January. On 24 May 2012, it was announced that Okore had been selected for Denmark's squad for UEFA Euro 2012 as well as the preceding friendly matches against Brazil and Australia.

Career statistics

Club

Honours 
Nordsjælland

 Danish Superliga 
 Winner: 2011–12
 Runner-up: 2012–13
 Danish Cup
 Winner: 2010–11

Aston Villa

 FA Cup
 Runner-up:2014–15

Copenhagen

 Danish Superliga
 Winner: 2016–17
 Danish Cup
 Winner: 2016–17

AaB

 Danish Cup
 Runner-up: 2019–20

References

External links
 Profile at DBU.dk 
 
 Profile and latest matches at Whoscored.com (in english)

1992 births
Living people
Footballers from Abidjan
Ivorian emigrants to Denmark
Danish men's footballers
Denmark under-21 international footballers
Denmark international footballers
Association football defenders
Boldklubben af 1893 players
FC Nordsjælland players
Danish Superliga players
Aston Villa F.C. players
F.C. Copenhagen players
AaB Fodbold players
UEFA Euro 2012 players
Danish expatriate men's footballers
Danish expatriate sportspeople in England
Expatriate footballers in England
Premier League players
Expatriate footballers in China
Danish expatriate sportspeople in China
Chinese Super League players
Changchun Yatai F.C. players
FA Cup Final players